The 2015–16 Pepperdine Waves men's basketball team represented Pepperdine University during the 2015–16 NCAA Division I men's basketball season. This was head coach Marty Wilson's fifth full season at Pepperdine. The Waves played their home games at the Firestone Fieldhouse and were members of the West Coast Conference. They finished the season 18–14, 10–8 in WCC play to finish in fourth place. They defeated San Francisco in the WCC tournament to advance to the semifinals where they lost to Saint Mary's. They were invited to the College Basketball Invitational where they lost in the first round to Eastern Washington.

Previous season
The Waves finished the season 18–14, 10–8 in WCC play to finish in fourth place. They advanced to the quarterfinals of the WCC tournament where they lost to Gonzaga. They were invited to the College Basketball Invitational where they lost in the first round to Seattle.

Departures

Recruiting Class of 2015

Roster

Schedule and results

|-
!colspan=9 style="background:#; color:white;"| Non conference regular season

|-
!colspan=9 style="background:#; color:white;"| WCC regular season

|-
!colspan=9 style="background:#; color:white;"| WCC tournament

|-
!colspan=9 style="background:#; color:white;"| College Basketball Invitational

References

Pepperdine Waves men's basketball seasons
Pepperdine
Pepperdine
Pepperdine
Pepperdine